Brendan Leahy (born 28 March 1960) is an Irish Roman Catholic prelate and theologian who has served as Bishop of Limerick since 2013.

Early life 
Leahy was born in the Rotunda Hospital, Dublin, on 28 March 1960, the third of four children to Maurice and Treasa Leahy, both of whom originated in west County Kerry and were primary school principals in Dublin. His father taught for a year in Athea, County Limerick, in the 1940s, while as a child, he spent long periods of the year living in Ballyferriter, County Kerry.

Leahy lived in Crumlin until he was six, before moving to Ballyroan, Rathfarnham. He attended primary school in St Damian's National School, Walkinstown, and secondary school at Coláiste Éanna.

Leahy completed his undergraduate studies in civil law at University College Dublin between 1977 and 1980, and theology, spirituality and psychology at Mater Dei Institute of Education between 1980 and 1981. He studied for the bar at King's Inns between 1981 and 1983, before being called to the bar in 1983.

Leahy completed further undergraduate studies in philosophy at Holy Cross College between 1981 and 1983, and theology at the Pontifical Gregorian University between 1983 and 1986. He was ordained to the priesthood for the Archdiocese of Dublin on 5 June 1986.

Presbyteral ministry 
Following his ordination, Leahy completed his doctorate in sacred theology at the Pontifical Gregorian University between 1983 and 1991, leading to a doctoral thesis on the Marian principle in the ecclesiology of Hans Urs von Balthasar.

He was appointed curate in Clonskeagh between 1991 and 1992, serving as the chaplain to St Kilian's German School, before being appointed in 1992 to the staff of Mater Dei Institute of Education until 2006, and Holy Cross College until its closure in 1999. Leahy also ministered in Sutton between 1995 and 1996, and was appointed archdiocesan censor in 1999 while also serving as a curate in Lusk until 2004. He was later appointed registrar of Mater Dei Institute of Education between 2004 and 2006.

On an archdiocesan level, Leahy served as a member of the presbyteral council and the College of Consultors between 1998 and 2004, as well as chair of the commission for ecumenism.

On a national level, Leahy served as secretary of the advisory committee on ecumenism of the Irish Catholic Bishops' Conference between 1999 and 2010, and as a member of the Three Faiths Forum since 1999. He has also served as co-chair of the theology forum of the Irish Inter-Church Meeting since 2010.

Having been involved with the Focolare Movement since his time at University College Dublin, Leahy lived in the Focolare Centre in Prosperous, County Kildare, between 2004 and 2013. He was nominated as an associate member of the Pontifical Academy of Theology in 2004, and appointed professor of systematic theology at St Patrick's College, Maynooth in 2006. He has also been a visiting lecturer at the  since its foundation in 2007.

Episcopal ministry 
Leahy was appointed Bishop-elect of Limerick by Pope Benedict XVI on 10 January 2013. He was consecrated on 14 April by the Archbishop of Cashel-Emly, Dermot Clifford, in St John's Cathedral, Limerick. Leahy was the first bishop to be consecrated in Ireland since the election of Pope Francis the previous March, and in the diocese since Jeremiah Newman in 1974.

Leahy is also President of Veritas and was appointed chair of the section on interfaith dialogue of the Commission of Evangelisation and Culture of the Council of European Bishops' Conferences in 2018.

Following the passing of a referendum on liberalising abortion laws on 25 May 2018, Leahy stated in an end-of-year reflection on 28 December that while he acknowledged that a majority voted in favour of the amendment, he hoped "that no-one, or at least very few, willing voted primarily for the abolition of the life of the unborn child in the womb". He added that while legislation provided for the introduction of abortion services in the Republic of Ireland from 1 January 2019, a culture must be promoted that defaults to protecting the unborn, rather than allowing abortion to become the default option for crisis pregnancies.

Ahead of a referendum on easing divorce restrictions in May 2019, Leahy expressed concern at the lack of discussion about the referendum, saying that it would be a shame for voters to tick a box without considering the social context and challenges faced by marriage in the present day. He asked for consideration to be given to establishing a marriage support agency in Ireland.

In response to claims from some Christians that God had punished the world with the onset of the COVID-19 pandemic, Leahy stated on 5 May 2020 that these claims were "a form of blasphemy".

Bibliography 
Leahy has both edited and authored a number of publications, both during his presbyteral ministry and his episcopal ministry.

References

External links

 Bishop Brendan Leahy on the Diocese of Limerick website
 Bishop Brendan Leahy on Catholic-Hierarchy.org
 Bishop Brendan Leahy on GCatholic

 

Alumni of University College Dublin
Alumni of Mater Dei Institute of Education
Alumni of Clonliffe College
Pontifical Gregorian University alumni
Irish barristers
Living people
1960 births
Roman Catholic bishops of Limerick
21st-century Roman Catholic bishops in Ireland
Alumni of King's Inns
21st-century Irish bishops
People educated at Coláiste Éanna